Maraba is a region in southern Rwanda. It used to be a district in the Butare Province before a government decentralization programme that re-organized the country's administrative divisions in 2006. It is now a sector of the Huye District in the Southern Province. The closest major city is Butare.

Maraba is most notable for its agricultural industry, which produces Maraba Coffee.

References

Geography of Rwanda